Runar Berg (born 7 October 1970) is a Norwegian former professional footballer who played as a midfielder. He played for Bodø/Glimt, Rosenborg, Tromsø, Lyn, and Venezia. Berg is brother of former Bodø/Glimt and Rosenborg player Ørjan Berg, and son of former Bodø/Glimt midfielder and playmaker Harald Berg.

Personal life
Berg was born in The Hague, Netherlands, when his father Harald Berg played for ADO Den Haag. He is the brother of footballers Ørjan Berg and Arild Berg, as well as musician Terje Berg. Berg is also the nephew of Norwegian folk-singer Terje Nilsen.

Club career
At the start of his adult football life, Runar Berg played – as his father – at Bodø/Glimt, then playing in the 1st division. The 1988 season Bodø/Glimt got relegated to the 2nd division. Runar Berg was bought by Nils Arne Eggen to Rosenborg to play with his brother Ørjan in the 1989 season.

In 1992, Berg returned to his mother club Bodø/Glimt then again playing in the 1st division. Bodø/Glimt won the first division and gained promotion for the Norwegian top division. In 1997, Berg returned to Rosenborg. In 1999, Berg made a move to Venezia, playing in the Serie A. The club had financial problems, however, and was relegated. Berg moved back to Norway on loan to Lyn, before returning "home" to Bodø/Glimt in 2001. He announced his retirement in September 2010.

Berg is considered a club legend at Bodø/Glimt. In the 2009 season, when the club had financial problems, Berg played for free. Being the best paid player at the club, Berg did not only give up his ~100,000 euro/year salary, but also started a fund-raiser among local businesses to help save the club. Berg has also earlier donated money to the club, as well as other sport clubs in the area.

In 2012, Berg made a comeback for local amateur side Junkeren.

International career
Berg made his debut for Norway in a January 1994 friendly match against the United States, coming on as a late substitute for Kjetil Rekdal and earned 5 caps, scoring no goals.
His final international match was a November 2003 European Championship qualifying match against Spain, again coming on as a late substitute, for Martin Andresen.

Career statistics

Honours 
Rosenborg
 Norwegian top division: 1990, 1997, 1998, 1999
 Norwegian Cup: 1990, 1999

Bodø/Glimt
 Norwegian Cup: 1993

References

External links
 

1970 births
Living people
Footballers from The Hague
Sportspeople from Bodø
Norwegian footballers
Norway international footballers
Norway youth international footballers
FK Bodø/Glimt players
Rosenborg BK players
Tromsø IL players
Venezia F.C. players
Lyn Fotball players
Expatriate footballers in Italy
Norwegian expatriate footballers
Eliteserien players
Norwegian First Division players
Serie A players
Serie B players
Association football midfielders
Berg family